The Jump is a 2020 Lithuanian documentary film directed and produced by Giedrė Žickytė. It was initially selected as the Lithuanian entry for the Best International Feature Film at the 94th Academy Awards, however, Isaac by Jurgis Matulevičius was ultimately submitted.

Overview

In 1970, Lithuanian seaman Simas Kudirka caused an international incident after attempting defection by boarding a U.S. Coast Guard ship.

See also
 List of submissions to the 94th Academy Awards for Best International Feature Film
 List of Lithuanian submissions for the Academy Award for Best International Feature Film

References

External links
 

2020 films
2020 documentary films
Lithuanian documentary films
Lithuanian-language films